Ernesto Sastre (born 17 December 1926) is a Colombian fencer. He competed in the individual and team épée and team foil events at the 1964 Summer Olympics.

References

1926 births
Living people
Colombian male épée fencers
Olympic fencers of Colombia
Fencers at the 1964 Summer Olympics
Colombian male foil fencers
20th-century Colombian people